The War Tapes is a 2006 American war documentary film directed by Deborah Scranton. The film is the first documentary account of the 2003 invasion of Iraq to be produced by the soldiers themselves. The film (released commercially in 2006) follows three New Hampshire Army National Guard soldiers before, during, and after their deployment to Iraq about a year after the invasion. Their unit was Charlie Company, 3rd Battalion, 172nd  Infantry Regiment (Mountain), which deployed from March 2004 to February 2005.

The three soldiers with cameras featured in the film are SPC Michael Moriarty who signed up in a burst of patriotism after 9/11 and asked to be shipped to Iraq. His colleagues are SGT Stephen Pink, who joined the National Guard to help pay for college, and SGT Zack Bazzi. Two other soldiers, SGT Duncan Domey and SPC Brandon Wilkins, also filmed their entire deployments for the film. In all, 17 soldiers were given cameras and recorded 800 hours of tape in Iraq. Stateside interviews with the soldiers and their families made up an additional 200 hours of tape. The "cast" was narrowed to three soldiers for the final feature-length film.  They were chosen in part because they were seen by the director and producers as the "main characters".

The film won the prize for Best International Documentary at the Tribeca Film Festival in May 2006 and also Best International Documentary at BRITDOC in July 2006. The documentary was released for sale on DVD in North America on May 15, 2007. Moreover, it is possibly the most innovative result of the embedded reporter program. In this case the reporter did not go to Iraq, but provided cameras to the soldiers, and provided direction on filming to them via instant messaging and email.

External links 
 The War Tapes official site/blog
 Interview with the filmmakers on the Tavis Smiley show
 Film sees war through soldiers' eyes, BBC News, 2 June 2006
 "The War Tapes": Soldiers Tell Their Own Iraq Stories, NPR, July 30, 2006
 3rd Battalion, 172nd Infantry Regiment (Mountain) at GlobalSecurity.org
 
C-SPAN Q&A interview with Steve James and Sgt. Zack Bazzi, about The War Tapes, July 16, 2006

References
Seven Days newspaper, "Operation Iraqi Footage" by Ken Picard, August 9–16, 2006

2006 films
Documentary films about the Iraq War
2006 documentary films
Military in New Hampshire
Films shot in New Hampshire
2000s English-language films
English-language documentary films